Port Allen is an unincorporated community in Iowa, United States, located along the Louisa-Muscatine County line on Iowa Highway 70. It was formerly a thriving town, but today is merely a housing sub-division.

Port Allen was platted in 1871 by Cyril Carpenter.

References

Unincorporated communities in Iowa
Unincorporated communities in Muscatine County, Iowa
1871 establishments in Iowa